Shashank Shah is an Indian surgeon. A specialist in laparoscopic bariatric surgery, he founded the Laparo Obeso Centre in 2003, and has been the director of the centre since then.

Training 
Shah completed his MBBS and MS at B. J. Medical College, Pune, in 1989 and 1992 respectively. He then started work as a general surgeon at KEM Hospital, Pune, before joining Poona Hospital and Research Centre, where he has been a general, laparoscopic and bariatric surgeon since 1995. Shah has also practised oncosurgery since 1992, and laparoscopic surgery since 1998. He received further training in laparoscopic surgery at the University of Erlangen in Germany in 2002.

In 2003, Shah was trained in bariatric surgery at the Gastro Obeso Center, Brazil, under Dr. Kelvin Higa in the United States, and at the University of Genoa, Italy under Dr. Nicola Scopinaro.

Career 
Shah performed bariatric surgery on D. Y. Patil in 2008; on one of the youngest patients for bariatric surgery, a seven-year-old boy; on the heaviest British person; and on Asia's heaviest woman in 2016.

In June 2018, Shah established the Obesity Prevention and Control Task Force of the Indian Medical Association (IMA), and became its chairman.

Shah is a visiting faculty at the Institute for Research into Cancer of the Digestive System (IRCAD) in France, and has been the head of the department and post-graduate teacher for Delhi National Board (DNB) general surgery since 2005. He is also a post-graduate teacher for minimal invasive surgery at Poona Hospital & Research Centre. He is a bariatric training faculty at the Ethicon Institute of Surgical Education (EISE) in Mumbai, and is the head of department for minimally invasive surgery fellowship at the Laparo Obeso Centre of Maharashtra University of Health Sciences. Shah has been the course director for bariatric surgery training at the Center of Excellence for Minimal Access Surgery Training (CEMAST). He also served on editorial board of the journals Journal of Obesity & Metabolic Research and Obesity Surgery.

Shah has been the president of three Indian societies related to obesity: the All India Association for Advancing Research in Obesity (AIAARO), the Obesity Surgery Society Of India (OSSI), and International Excellence Federation, India Chapter (IEF). He is the founder and scientific committee member of the online bariatric surgery academy, Barialink.

In 2011, he performed a laparoscopic surgery for a large kidney tumour on Madhukarrao Chavan, the then State Animal Husbandry Minister. His video for Thoracoscopic Thymectomy for Mysthenia Gravis was published in the SAGES video library in 2005.

Awards 
 2008: IIT Innovation Award for metabolic surgery for type 2 diabetes in IIT innovations
 2016: Vivian Fonseca Scholar Award by the American Diabetes Association
 2017: Jaipal Singh Memorial Orator from the Association of Surgeons of India

Publications

References 

Indian surgeons
Living people
Year of birth missing (living people)
People from Pune